Nekurseni is a small town in Paschim Medinipur District of West Bengal, India located approximately 50 km south of Kharagpur. Nekurseni is an ancient town dating back to the era of Ashoka. Nekurseni is named after the wife of the fabled giant Nekursena. The NH 60, familiar as O. T. Road before has connected this town to the rest part of India.

Nekurseni railway station is administrative control of South Eastern Railway. Nearby two stations are Belda and Dantan. Nearby railhead junction station is Khargapur.

Geography 
The gram panchayats Ranisarai-8 located in the Narayangarh community development block in the Kharagpur subdivision of the Paschim Medinipur district.

Culture and festival 
Inspired by Bengali Cultures. Most famous festivals are Durga Puja, Kali Puja, Saraswati Puja, Diwali and another one.

Going to Nekurseni

From Kolkata 

By Train: It's 162 km from Howrah via Khargapur, previous station is Belda.
By Bus: It's too hard to go through Bus.
Local Trains from Khargapur are frequently available which stops at Nekurseni.
Starting from morning 6.30 am at Khargapur, there are 4 trains to Nekurseni till 6 pm.

From Kharagpur or Midnapore 
Take a bus to Sonakonia from Khargapur or Midnapore. From Kharagpur it takes about 60 min.
Mainly two Bus stands -
Nekurseni School
Nekurseni Bazar

From Dantan or Sonakonia 

Take a bus to Contai or Midnapore from Sonakonia or Dantan. From Dantan it takes about 15 minute.

Schools 
Nekurseni Vivekananda Vidyabhaban
Nekurseni Primary School

References 

 "Directory of District, Sub division, Panchayat Samiti/ Block and Gram Panchayats in West Bengal, March 2008". West Bengal. National Informatics Centre, India. 2008-03-19. Retrieved 2008-12-27.
 "Contact details of Block Development Officers". Paschim Medinipur district. Panchayats and Rural Development Department, Government of West Bengal. Retrieved 2008-12-27.

Cities and towns in Paschim Medinipur district